= Green Diamond Mystery =

1925 Australian radio serial

Green Diamond Mystery is a 1925 Australian radio serial by Codrington Ball and directed by Scott Alexander. It was the first radio serial ever produced in Australia and was made in Sydney for station 2FC.

The serial went for six episodes. It was very popular.

Copies of the scripts are with Codrington Ball's papers at the State Library of new South Wales.

== Episodes ==
- Ep One (29 September 1925)
- Ep Two (8 October (1925)
- Ep Three (15 October 1925)
- Ep Four (22 October 1925)
- Ep Five (29 October 1929)
- Ep Six (4 November 1929)
